Soapstone Prairie Natural Area is a  park and conservation area in northeastern Larimer County, Colorado, United States. The City of Fort Collins purchased the land for Soapstone Prairie Natural Area in 2004, which was opened to the public in 2009.

Ecology
The natural habitat of eastern Colorado was shortgrass prairie. Over the past 150 years much of the land was used for agriculture. Of the 40% of the remaining shortgrass prairie, much of it is degraded and fragmented due to neighboring cities, towns and farms. The area has thriving prairie dog colonies. Almost 60 endangered black-footed ferrets were reintroduced in 2014 whose main source of food is prairie dogs. 

The Natural Resources Department of Larimer County recognized that grazing was important for soil, vegetation and overall ecological balance and that Bison were the primary historical grazers before being extirpated. The managers wanted to create a herd that could act as a seed herd that would help establish bison with heritage genetics. Establishing a conservation Herd became a collaborative effort of Larimer County, the City of Fort Collins, the US Department of Agriculture’s Animal and Plant Health Inspection Service, and Colorado State University. Yellowstone genetically valuable bison were introduced in 2015 onto the contiguous lands of Soapstone Prairie Natural Area and Red Mountain Open Space.

Archaeological site

The Lindenmeier site, named for the previous Lindenmeier Ranch, is a Folsom archaeological site on the Soapstone Prairie Natural Area.  The site contains the most extensive Folsom culture campsite yet found with an uncorrected averaged radiocarbon date of 10,660±60 B.P., or 8,710 B.C.  The site was declared a National Historic Landmark on January 20, 1961.

See also
 Fort Collins, Colorado

References

External links
  Soapstone Prairie Natural Area
Laramie Foothills Bison Conservation Herd
 City of Fort Collins: Soapstone Prairie Management Plan
 Red Mountain Open Space, Larimer County 
 Museo de las Tres Colonias
 Cathy Fromme Prairie Natural Area, Fort Collins

Protected areas of Larimer County, Colorado
Protected areas established in 2004
2004 establishments in Colorado